Dominik Jończy (born 17 May 1997) is a Polish professional footballer who plays as a centre-back for Zagłębie Sosnowiec.

Career
Jończy made his professional debut for Zagłębie Lubin in the Ekstraklasa on 7 April 2017, starting in the home match against Jagiellonia Białystok, which finished as a 4–3 loss.

References

External links
 
 
 

1997 births
Living people
People from Jelenia Góra
Sportspeople from Lower Silesian Voivodeship
Polish footballers
Poland youth international footballers
Poland under-21 international footballers
Association football central defenders
Zagłębie Lubin players
Chojniczanka Chojnice players
Podbeskidzie Bielsko-Biała players
Zagłębie Sosnowiec players
Ekstraklasa players
I liga players
III liga players